ChemPro, Inc. was a consumers goods company based in Spartanburg, South Carolina. The corporation made branded and private label heavy-duty household cleaning products sold through dollar store, mass and grocery channels.

History
ChemPro was founded in 1990 by Clayton Jones. Clayton Jones invented Mean Green Super Strength Cleaner and Degreaser which is marked internationally. Allied Capital acquired ChemPro in March 2006 for 99.2 million dollars. Allied then merged Redox Brands and ChemPro, Inc., with the resulting company being renamed CR Brands.

Brands
 Mean Green
 Pine Power
 Magnum Power

See also
 Redox Brands
 CR Brands

External links
 Official website

References

Spartanburg, South Carolina
Manufacturing companies established in 1999
Companies based in Spartanburg, South Carolina
1999 establishments in South Carolina
Defunct manufacturing companies based in South Carolina